In alignment with postmodern marketing, postmodern branding hinges on personifying the brand based on a core set of traits as opposed to creating templates, blueprints or guidelines.  Postmodern branding is more about understanding and leveraging technology, space and mindset of the moment to create an enriched user experience.

Idris Mootee cites in, “Branding in the Post-Modern Culture When Consumer Transcends the State of Being the Subject in a Society” that brands are becoming more and more important in this day of age.  When looking at how the media ecosystem has evolved with the developments of Twitter, Facebook, mobile codes and video, a marketer can see that the brand “exists beyond the ads and the products”.  As a result, brands have found new ways to enter the home and places in the consumers life. This newly developed entryway and space usually takes the form of branded content, branded entertainment, branded utilities,   and most importantly brand personification (which occurs when the brand is treated and engaged with as one would engage with a physical person.  i.e. make appointments with, talk to, touching, etc.).

These are behaviors predominantly found in the daily life of the postmodern consumer.  Watching scheduled TV programs, utilizing and interacting with voice recognition services like Siri are examples of how branded content and utilities are becoming more predominate within our current culture.  Although some examples are eroding away like scheduled TV viewing (according to JD Power and Associates roughly 45% of cable TV service customer have a DVR subscription, which is up from 38% in 2010), others are introduces with remarkable interfaces and user engagement protocols.  Mobile applications like Siri allow users interact with their phone at treat it like a personal assistant.

Successful branding within the postmodern society rely more on the developments of brand personality.  Developing brand personality sets the stage in identifying deeper meaning around “How it, the brand, works.” The formation of studying and defining a brand in this manner hinges on the trait theory of psychology. According to this theory, inherent traits (habitual patterns, thoughts and emotions) are perceived to remain relatively stable over time. Holding inherent traits constant while manipulating environmental cues and situational stimuli, natural personalities emerge.  When applied to marketing, this process is called a brand-trait observational research study. By performing such studies a brand is able to extract “marketable” personalities; thus creating “livable brand personas”.  These personas are then used to help brands live better and more fluently within social destinations, communities and strategist around technical road maps, developments and customer interactions.

See also 
Postmodern brands

References 

Advertising
Communication design
Brand management
Types of branding